The Hudson Valley LGBTQ Community Center was founded in 2005 as the community center for the lesbian, gay, bisexual, transgender and queer residents of the mid-Hudson Valley.

The Center is located in a three-story building at the corner of Wall and John Streets in Kingston, New York. The first floor, offering free WiFi access, serves as a rotating art gallery and large function space. Meeting rooms on the second floor host the majority of Center programs and meetings.

The Center's second-floor library houses more than 800 fiction, non-fiction and reference titles. An LGBT film archive, donated by screenwriter Ron Nyswaner and Hudson Valley resident Barbara Salzman, contains more than 1100 titles and is available for research, film festivals and screenings in the center.

The Center, in partnership with New York State and Ulster County Social Services, provides intake counseling for Food Stamps and the Home Energy Assistance Program.

References

Lambda Legal: Hudson Valley LGBTQ Community Center v. Bahruth
Lambda Legal: Lambda Legal Represents Not-for-Profit Hudson Valley LGBTQ Center in Fight Against City of Kingston’s Discriminatory Tax
Fried Frank: Hudson Valley LGBTQ Community Center
National Association of LGBT Centers: Directory Listing
Guidestar: Directory Listing
New York State Office of Temporary and Disability Assistance: Directory Listing

External links 

 Official website

LGBT community centers in the United States
LGBT in New York (state)
Non-profit organizations based in New York (state)